"Man of Steel" is a song by American Rock singer Meat Loaf and features Pearl Aday, Meat Loaf's adoptive daughter. It was released as the third single from his 2003 album Couldn't Have Said It Better. "Man of Steel" was written by James Michael and Nikki Sixx. The single was released by Mercury on 23 November 2003.

Speaking with Paul Stenning upon the album's release, Meat Loaf explained the background behind the song, saying:

"My daughter Pearl was out on tour with Motley Crue and people said to me 'you let your daughter go on tour with Motley Crue!?’ I said ‘she's a big girl’, 26 at the time; ‘she can make up her own mind’. But I did scare Nikki Sixx when I went to see the show." He explains, "I approached him in my best bad guy movie role after he'd just come off stage. I said, 'Let's go in this other room cause me and you are going to talk about what you have my daughter wearing. Right now!' He went white, like an English suntan. He started stuttering at me trying to explain she picked it out and he had nothing to do with it and then I just grinned at him.
"He kept saying to Pearl she should do a duet with me. He decided as a surprise, he called James Michael who was writing already for this record (he'd also worked with Nikki on the last Motley Crue record) and said let's write a song for Pearl and her dad to sing together. That was Man of Steel and they sent it to me and everybody got really mad at me because I wouldn't listen to it for nine or ten weeks. I didn’t know what the album was going to be, I was waiting on James Michael to give me the first piece. After so many discussions I wanted to hear where it was going."

Track listing 
 "Man Of Steel" (Radio Edit)
 "Tear Me Down" (Live)
 "Love You Out Loud" (Live)

References 

Meat Loaf songs
Songs written by James Michael
Songs written by Nikki Sixx
2003 singles
2003 songs
Mercury Records singles